Still Life with a Silver Jug is a 1655–1660 still life painting by the Dutch artist Willem Kalf (1619-1693), now in the Rijksmuseum in Amsterdam, which purchased it at the sale of Albertus Jonas Brandt's collection in Amsterdam on 29 October 1821. 

Title : Stilleven met zilveren schenkkan (Still Life with Silver Jug in dutch)

Artist name : Willem Kalf

Date : 1655 - 1657

Location : Rijksmuseum, Amsterdam, Netherlands

Technique : chiaroscuro 

Medium : oil on canvas

Sources
http://hdl.handle.net/10934/RM0001.COLLECT.8859

1650s paintings
1660s paintings
Still life paintings
Paintings in the collection of the Rijksmuseum
Paintings by Willem Kalf
https://artsandculture.google.com/asset/still-life-with-silver-jug-willem-kalf/yQG64-MS1Z5DmQ